APO Kanaris Nenita F.C. is a Greek football club, based in Nenita, Chios.

The club was founded in 1958. They will play for the first time in Gamma Ethniki for the season 2015-16.

Honors

Domestic Titles and honors
 Eps Chios Champions: 9
 1981-82, 1983–84, 1985–86, 1995–96, 2005–06, 2012–13, 2014–15, 2016-17, 2017-18
 Eps Chios Cup Winners: 2
 1987-88, 2009–10

External links
 http://www.kanarischios.gr

Football clubs in Greece
Football clubs in North Aegean
Chios